Abaciscus shaneae is a species of moth belonging to the family Geometridae. It was described by Jeremy Daniel Holloway in 1993. It is known from Borneo.

The wingspan is about 17 mm.

References

Boarmiini
Moths described in 1993
Moths of Asia